Jesús González is a paralympic athlete from Spain competing mainly in category T36 distance running events.

González has competed in two paralympics, firstly in Atlanta in 1996 where he finished outside the medals in both the 1500m and 5000m.  He also competed at the 2000 Summer Paralympics where he ran the 800m and also won a bronze medal in the 1500m

References

External links
 

Paralympic athletes of Spain
Athletes (track and field) at the 1996 Summer Paralympics
Athletes (track and field) at the 2000 Summer Paralympics
Paralympic bronze medalists for Spain
Living people
Place of birth missing (living people)
Year of birth missing (living people)
Medalists at the 2000 Summer Paralympics
Paralympic medalists in athletics (track and field)
Spanish male middle-distance runners